is a railway station on the Hakone Tozan Line located in Odawara, Kanagawa Prefecture, Japan. It is 1.7 rail kilometers from the line's terminus at Odawara Station.

History
Hakone-Itabashi Station was opened on 10 October 1935, when the Hakone Tozan Railway (founded 1928) changed its Odawara - Hakone-Yumoto tram line to a railway.

Station numbering was introduced in January 2014 with Hakone-Itabashi being assigned station number OH48.

Lines
Hakone Tozan Railway
Hakone Tozan Line

Building
Hakone-Itabashi station has an island platform and a side platform serving three tracks; however, the side platform is not in use.

Platforms

Bus services
Hakone Tozan Bus
"H" line for Hakone Machi Ko (Lake Ashi) via Hakone Yumoto Station, Miyanoshita, Kowakidani Station, Kowaki-en, Moto Hakone Ko (Hakone Shrine), Hakone Checkpoint
"T" line for Togendai (Lake Ashi) via Hakone Yumoto Station, Miyanoshita, Sengoku (transfer for JR Gotemba Station & Gotemba Premium Outlets)
for Odawara Station
Izu Hakone Bus
"J" & "Z" lines for Hakone Checkpoint (Lake Ashi) via Hakone Yumoto Station, Miyanoshita, Kowakidani Station, Kowaki-en, Moto Hakone (Hakone Shrine), Kojiri
for Odawara Station

References

External links
 Hakone Tozan Railway Official Site
 Hakone Tozan Bus Official Site 

Railway stations in Kanagawa Prefecture
Railway stations in Japan opened in 1935
Railway stations in Odawara